Francisco Javier de Cienfuegos y Jovellanos (12 March 1766 – 1847) was a Spanish bishop and cardinal. He was born in Oviedo. He was bishop of Cádiz (1819–1824) and archbishop of Seville (1824–1847).

References

External links
 

1766 births
1847 deaths
19th-century Spanish cardinals
Roman Catholic archbishops of Seville
People from Oviedo